Mother's Institute of Technology, Bihta, is a private degree engineering college situated in Gaya, Bihar, India.

About college
It offers undergraduate degree engineering in computer science and engineering, electrical engineering, mechanical engineering and civil engineering. This college is affiliated with the Aryabhatta Knowledge University (AKU).

See also

References

External links 
http://www.mitbihta.org/
Aryabhatta Knowledge University

Engineering colleges in Bihar
Colleges affiliated to Aryabhatta Knowledge University
1989 establishments in Bihar
Educational institutions established in 1989